The 2022–23 St. Louis Blues season is the 56th season for the National Hockey League franchise that was established in 1967.

Standings

Divisional standings

Conference standings

Schedule and results

Preseason
The Blues Preseason schedule was released on July 5th, 2022.

Regular season
The regular season schedule was published on July 6, 2022.

Player statistics
As of March 11, 2023

Skaters

Goaltenders

†Denotes player spent time with another team before joining the Blues. Stats reflect time with the Blues only.
‡Denotes player was traded mid-season. Stats reflect time with the Blues only.

Roster

Transactions
The Blues have been involved in the following transactions during the 2022–23 season.

Trades

Notes:
 Blues retain 50% of Tarasenko's salary

Players acquired

Players lost

Signings

Draft picks

Below are the St. Louis Blues selections at the 2022 NHL Entry Draft, which were held on July 7 to 8, 2022. It was held at the Bell Centre in Montreal, Quebec.

Notes
 The Blues traded their second round pick (No. 55) to New York along with Sammy Blais in the trade that brought Pavel Buchnevich to St. Louis. New York then traded the pick conditionally to Winnipeg to acquire forward Andrew Copp. 
 The Blues traded their seventh-round pick (No. 216) to Montreal along with goaltender Jake Allen in exchange for two picks in the 2020 NHL Draft, used to select Dylan Peterson (No. 86) and Noah Beck (No. 194).
 The Blues acquired a third-round pick (No. 73) from Detroit in exchange for goaltender Ville Husso.

References

St. Louis Blues seasons
St. Louis Blues
St. Louis Blues
St. Louis Blues